Joseph Vilsmaier (24 January 1939 – 11 February 2020) was a German film director who began his career as a technician and cameraman. He is internationally known for films such as Comedian Harmonists.

Life 
Born in Munich. Vilsmaier attended a boarding school near Augsburg. He then trained as a technician to make film cameras, and studied piano at the Musikhochschule München. He was a member of a jazz group. After working as a technician, he moved into film, first as a material and camera assistant, then from 1961 as a cameraman. He filmed episodes of television series such as Tatort.

His debut film as director, Herbstmilch in 1988, starring his wife, Dana Vávrová, was a huge success. In 1995, he directed Schlafes Bruder, after the novel by Robert Schneider. In 1997, he directed Comedian Harmonists which became an international success. For the films he directed, Vilsmaier was also the producer and first cameraman.

While filming Der Letzte Zug in 2005, probably the last film produced by Artur Brauner, he was injured when he fell off a camera tower. Subsequently, his ability to work was limited, and his wife took over directing the film. The couple was awarded the special jury prize at the 2006 Bavarian Film Awards for Der letzte Zug.

Dana Vávrová died on 5 February 2009.

Vilsmaier died on 11 February 2020.

Awards
 Bavarian Film Awards
 1990 Best Production
 1992 Bavarian Film Awards, Best Producing, Best Cinematography
 1995 Bavarian Film Award, Best Production
 1997 Bavarian Film Award, Best Director
 2006 Bavarian Film Award, Special Prize
 18th Moscow International Film Festival
 Nominated – Stalingrad

Filmography 
Vilsmaier directed films and television films, including:

 Herbstmilch (1988)
  (1990)
 Stalingrad (1993)
 Charlie & Louise – Das doppelte Lottchen (1994)
 Schlafes Bruder (1995)
  (1996)
 Comedian Harmonists (1997)
 Marlene (2000)
 Leo & Claire (2001)
  (2004)
 Der letzte Zug (2006)
  (2008, TV film)
  (2008)
 Nanga Parbat (2010)
  (2012, TV film)
  (2012)

References

External links 
 
 
 Heftige Gefühle entwickeln (portrait on the occasion of his 80th birthday) , 24 January 2019

1939 births
2020 deaths
Film directors from Munich
Mountaineering film directors
Commanders Crosses of the Order of Merit of the Federal Republic of Germany